Clear Fork may refer to a location in the United States:

Clear Fork (Big South Fork Cumberland River) in Tennessee
Clear Fork (Cumberland River) in Kentucky and Tennessee
Clear Fork (Guyandotte River), a tributary of the Guyandotte River, in West Virginia
Clear Fork, Virginia, an unincorporated community
Clear Fork, West Virginia, a town
Clear Fork (Oregon), a stream in the U.S. state of Oregon
Clear Fork Mohican River in Ohio
Clear Fork Brazos River in Texas